Alfredo Alberto Pacheco (December 1, 1982 – December 27, 2015) was a Salvadoran footballer who had the record for most appearances on the El Salvador national football team when he was banned for life in 2013, for match-fixing while playing for the national team. He was murdered on December 27, 2015.

Career

Club
Pacheco spent the majority of his career with one of El Salvador's biggest clubs, FAS. After moving through the junior ranks and into the first team reserves, he was given his first chance to play in the Salvadoran Primera División in 2001. He made his professional debut on March 3, 2001, in a league match against C.D. Municipal Limeño. In 2005, he was named club captain.

On February 18, 2009, it was announced that New York Red Bulls head coach Juan Carlos Osorio had gone to El Salvador with the hopes of bringing Pacheco to Major League Soccer. Pacheco had been scouted for several months, most notably during FIFA World Cup qualification matches, as well as during the UNCAF Nations Cup tournament. It was initially announced that Pacheco signed with New York Red Bulls on March 5, 2009, but due to difficulties surrounding his International Transfer Card,  the New York front office did not officially announce his signing until April 17, 2009.  In the meantime Pacheco started training with the Red Bulls on April 7, 2009  and after his official signing, made his first appearance on April 18, 2009. After a bright start, Pacheco struggled on the field for New York, and the team terminated his loan deal before the end of the season.
Pacheco signed a two-year contract with C.D. Águila on June 30, 2010. However, he left the club just one year into his contract with Aguila to join Isidro Metápan starting with 2011/12 season.

International
Pacheco began his international career with El Salvador's U-20 national team in 2000. He took part in the 2003 CONCACAF U-20 Tournament, which was held throughout 2002. El Salvador failed to qualify for the FIFA World Youth Championship that was to be held in the United Arab Emirates.

That same year Pacheco was also part of the El Salvador U-23 team that won the Central American and Caribbean Games gold medal, after defeating Mexico in the final.

Again, that same year, Pacheco received his first cap with the men's national team. This was on November 17, 2002, in a friendly match against the USA. Pacheco scored his first goal for El Salvador, off a free-kick vs Costa Rica in a 2003 Gold Cup Quarterfinals match. Pacheco was then the top most capped player of all-time for El Salvador with 86 caps.

On September 20, 2013, Pacheco was one of 14 Salvadoran players banned for life due to their involvement with match fixing.

Personal life
Pacheco lived with his wife Elizabeth de Pacheco and two children, his daughter Alexia Pacheco and Marco Pacheco .

Death
Pacheco was murdered on December 27, 2015. Early reports said he was shot when leaving a bathroom at a gas station in Santa Ana, El Salvador. It was later reported he was shot from point blank range and killed by a shot in the abdomen.

References

External links
 El Grafico Profile  

1982 births
2015 deaths
Sportspeople from Santa Ana, El Salvador
Association football defenders
Salvadoran footballers
El Salvador international footballers
2003 UNCAF Nations Cup players
2003 CONCACAF Gold Cup players
2005 UNCAF Nations Cup players
2007 UNCAF Nations Cup players
2007 CONCACAF Gold Cup players
2009 UNCAF Nations Cup players
2009 CONCACAF Gold Cup players
C.D. FAS footballers
New York Red Bulls players
C.D. Águila footballers
A.D. Isidro Metapán footballers
Major League Soccer players
Salvadoran expatriate footballers
Expatriate soccer players in the United States
Sportspeople involved in betting scandals
Sportspeople banned for life
Male murder victims
People murdered in El Salvador
Salvadoran murder victims
Deaths by firearm in El Salvador
2015 crimes in El Salvador
2015 murders in North America
2010s murders in El Salvador